Foundation and Chaos (1998) is a science fiction novel by Greg Bear, set in Isaac Asimov's Foundation universe. It is the second book of the Second Foundation trilogy, which was written after Asimov's death by three authors, authorized by the Asimov estate.

Plot summary

The novel is the second part of the Second Foundation Trilogy and takes place almost entirely in the same time frame as "The Psychohistorians", which is the first part of the novel Foundation. In addition to telling a more expanded version of Hari Seldon's confrontation with the Commission of Public Safety it also interweaves R. Daneel Olivaw's struggle against a sect of robots who oppose his plans for humanity.

While covering the same period as in Asimov’s "The Psychohistorians", Foundation and Chaos focuses more on paternal superrobot R Daneel Olivaw than on Hari Seldon. Olivaw’s 20 millennia of machinations and contrivances are questioned by “Calvinian” robots who do not observe Olivaw’s Zeroth Law (“No robot may harm humanity or, through inaction, allow humanity to come to harm”) developed in Asimov’s Robots and Empire. Olivaw’s actions dampen human intellectual growth and variation until the human species matures. The novel’s primary issue is whether Olivaw’s ends justify his means. Does the ancient Auroran robot really serve humanity’s greater good? Should Olivaw decide this for himself?

Seldon seems unaware of Olivaw’s role in perpetuating brain fever and other dampeners. But Seldon would probably approve, considering his quarantining of the New Renaissance worlds when Seldon served as Imperial 1st Minister.

Foundation and Chaos portrays the rise of mentalics (telepaths who can influence other’s thoughts) such as Wanda Seldon and Stettin Palver, who will form the Second Foundation. Twisted rogue mentalic Vara Liso even foreshadows the mutant Magnifico’s spectacular rise 310 years later. Powerful Public Safety Commissioner Linge Chen again plays a prominent role as the true Imperial power behind fatuous playboy Emperor Klayus. Reconstructed superrobot Dors Venabili reappears as well.

Reviews
Review by Gary K. Wolfe (1998) in Locus, #446 March 1998
Review by Thomas Marcinko (1998) in Science Fiction Age, May 1998
Review by Curt Wohleber (1998) in Science Fiction Weekly, 1 June 1998
Review by Mark L. Olson (1998) in Aboriginal Science Fiction, Summer 1998
Review by Nigel Brown (1998) in Interzone, #138 December 1998
Review by Steven H Silver (1998) in SF Site, Mid-April 1998, (1998)
Review by Darrell Schweitzer (1999) in Aboriginal Science Fiction, Fall 1999
Review by Gary Wilkinson (1999) in Vector 208

References

1998 American novels
1998 science fiction novels
Foundation universe books
Novels by Greg Bear